Montélimar (Vivaro-Alpine: Montelaimar) is a town in the Drôme department in the Auvergne-Rhône-Alpes region in north Provence, Southeastern France. It is the second-largest city in the department after Valence. In 2018, the commune had a population of 39,415; its urban area had a population of 57,372.

History
The site where the city of Montélimar stands today has been inhabited since the Celtic era. It was reconstructed during the Roman reign, including a basilica, aqueducts, thermae and a forum. The Adhémar family reigned over the city in the Middle Ages and built a castle (Château des Adhémar) which dominates the city silhouette even today.

Demographics

Personalities 
 French navigator Louis de Freycinet and Émile Loubet, President of France from 1899 till 1906, who served also as mayor of Montélimar. 
 Formula One racing driver Charles Pic, brother and fellow racing driver Arthur Pic and motorcycle racer Sylvain Guintoli.
 Encyclopédiste Antoine Penchenier (died in 1761) at an unknown date.
 Physician and Encyclopédiste Jean-Joseph Menuret (1739–1815) was born in Montélimar
 Louis Deschamps (painter) (1846 - 1902) was born in Montélimar
 Singer, writer, actress, TV host and fashion designer Marianne James was born in Montélimar in 1962.
 Michèle Rivasi, elected member of the European Parliament since 2009, was born in Montélimar in 9-2-1953.

Economy

The local nougat is one of the 13 desserts of Provence and highly appreciated throughout the country. Montelimar nougat is mentioned in the opening lines of the Beatles' "Savoy Truffle" from The White Album. Travellers used to buy nougat de Montélimar on their way to the south of France (or when returning) as the city is next to the Rhône and to the primary route N7. Since the construction of the A7 autoroute, many nougat factories have been forced to close as tourists no longer stop in Montélimar but bypass it instead.

Climate
Montélimar has a humid subtropical climate (Cfa) according to the Köppen climate classification.

International relations
Montélimar is twinned with:

 Mollet del Vallès, Spain
 Nabeul, Tunisia
 Racine, United States
 Ravensburg, Germany
 Rhondda Cynon Taf, Wales, United Kingdom
 Rivoli, Italy
 Sisian, Armenia

See also
Communes of the Drôme department

References

External links

 Official website
 

 
Communes of Drôme
Dauphiné
Drôme communes articles needing translation from French Wikipedia
Populated places on the Rhône
Populated riverside places in France